Cactoblastis mundelli is a species of snout moth in the genus Cactoblastis. It was described by Carl Heinrich in 1939 and is known from Peru.

Males have dull white hindwings with a faint smoky tint. The forewings have an ocherous suffusion.

The larvae feed on Austrocylindropuntia subulata.

References

Phycitini
Moths described in 1939